Daur Leontevich Kurmazia (born 28 August 1974) is the current Minister for Taxes and Fees of Abkhazia in the Government of President Khajimba. Kurmazia was appointed on 1 November 2016 in the new cabinet of Prime Minister Beslan Bartsits.

References

1974 births
Living people
Ministers for Taxes and Fees of Abkhazia
People from Gudauta